Deb and Sisi is a blue comedy/dark comedy feature film, written, produced and directed by Mark Kenneth Woods, which had its debut at the Out On Screen Vancouver Queer Film Festival in August, 2008. The DVD was released May 25, 2010 through MKW Productions and the film aired on television for the first time on October 30, 2011 on OUTtv in Canada.

Synopsis
Deb and Sisi follows homely Deborah Dyer (Mark Kenneth Woods) who tries everything she can to "suicide herself" when she finds herself still single on her 40th birthday. But all attempts fail as fate sends her car swerving right into Sisi Sickles (Michael Venus), a recently evicted  promiscuous alcoholic. Seeing an opportunity for a quick buck, Sisi is soon at Deb's doorstep with a "broken umbilical cord or two". Stricken with guilt, a naïve Deb postpones her self-destructive plans to take care of Sisi, but quickly discovers that killing herself might be an easier option after all.

Cast

Critical reception
Yvonne Zacharais of the Vancouver Sun called the film "A delightful and hilarious film that would probably appeal to straight folks as much as queers."

References

External links

Trailer

2008 films
2008 black comedy films
English-language Canadian films
Canadian LGBT-related films
Canadian black comedy films
Fictional LGBT couples
LGBT-related black comedy films
2008 LGBT-related films
2008 comedy films
2000s English-language films
2000s Canadian films